The Russell 3000 Index is a capitalization-weighted stock market index that seeks to be a benchmark of the entire U.S. stock market. It measures the performance of the 3,000 largest publicly held companies incorporated in America as measured by total market capitalization, and represents approximately 97% of the American public equity market. The index was launched on January 1, 1984, and is maintained by FTSE Russell, a subsidiary of the London Stock Exchange Group. The ticker symbol on most systems is ^RUA.

Record values

Annual returns

Investing
The Russell 3000 Index is tracked by several exchange-traded funds, such as the iShares Russell 3000 ETF and the Vanguard Russell 3000 ETF.

Ten largest constituents
Apple
Microsoft
Amazon
Alphabet (Class A)
Tesla
Alphabet (Class C)
Meta Platforms
Nvidia
Berkshire Hathaway
UnitedHealth
(as of December 31, 2021)

Top sectors by weight
Technology
Consumer Discretionary
Health Care
Industrials
Financials
Consumer Staples
Telecommunications
Real Estate
Utilities
Energy
Basic Materials

(as of September 30, 2020)

See also
S&P 1500
Russell Investments
Russell 2000 Index
Russell 1000 Index

References

External links
 Russell Investment Group
 Index Construction and Methodology
 Yahoo! Finance page for ^RUA
 Bloomberg page for RAY:IND
3000_Index
American stock market indices